Yanchep railway station is a proposed station on the Joondalup Line in Perth, Western Australia that is being delivered as part of the Metronet Yanchep rail extension project.

The station will include a bus interchange with 14 weather-protected stands with its flexible design meaning buses can drop passengers either internally to the bus station or externally near commercial development. The station also will hold approximately 1000 parking bays, with a dedicated passenger drop-off area.

The station will be situated east of Marmion Avenue and will be accessed off the future Toreopango Avenue, as part of the Yanchep City Centre development developed by the Yanchep Beach Joint Venture. Approximately 11,032 daily boardings are predicted at Yanchep Station in 2031. The station will have two  platforms. Services to  will be provided by Transperth Trains, with the journey to take approximately 49 minutes.

At the 2021–22 State Budget, it was announced that the Yanchep rail extension had been deferred by 12 months, as a result of Western Australia's skills shortage. This was alongside the deferment of 15 other state government infrastructure projects.

Foundation works on the station began in December 2021.

References

External links
 Yanchep Rail Extension website page for Alkimos, Eglinton and Yanchep stations.

Proposed railway stations in Perth, Western Australia
Yanchep